The Jim Gaffigan Show is an American sitcom written and executive produced by comedian Jim Gaffigan and his wife Jeannie Gaffigan. Gaffigan stars as a fictionalized version of himself as a stand-up comedian raising five children in a two-bedroom New York City apartment. An 11-episode first season debuted on July 15, 2015, on TV Land.  On August 31, 2015, TV Land renewed the series for a 12-episode second season, which premiered on June 19, 2016.
On August 22, 2016, Jim and Jeannie Gaffigan announced that the series would not be returning for a third season so they could spend more time with their kids. As of 2021, the whole series is available to watch on streaming apps PlutoTV and Paramount+.

Cast
 Jim Gaffigan as a fictionalized version of himself
 Ashley Williams as Jeannie Gaffigan, Jim's wife
 Michael Ian Black as Daniel Benjamin, Jeannie's confidante
 Adam Goldberg as Dave Marks, Jim's best friend who is a struggling comedian
 Tongayi Chirisa as Father Nicholas, the rector at Jim and Jeannie's church
 Vanessa Aspillaga as Blanca, the nanny of Jim and Jeannie's kids
 Caitlin Moeller as Elizabeth Gaffigan

Comedians Chris Rock, Dave Attell, Bill Burr, Hannibal Buress, John Mulaney, Whitney Cummings, Esther Ku, Jim Norton, Will Ferrell and political personality Joe Scarborough make guest appearances as fictional versions of themselves, as do TV personality Jimmy Fallon and actors Steve Buscemi, Matthew Broderick, Nathan Lane and Alec Baldwin. Macaulay Culkin makes multiple cameo appearances as himself holding different low-income jobs and appearing on The Tonight Show Starring Jimmy Fallon.

Production

Development

NBC first showed interest in the show, but eventually passed. CBS previously tried twice to develop Jim Gaffigan's semi-autobiographical series. While still in talks with NBC, Jeannie would have played herself in the show, however CBS decided to cast someone—a decision she agreed with—and she joined in casting the role.  The network ordered a pilot episode in January 2013, at which time Mira Sorvino was attached to play Gaffigan's wife, with Christian Barillas and Tongayi Chirisa in supporting roles. CBS passed on the series in May 2013 and instead planned to redevelop it for the 2014-15 television season. The series was recast with new cast members Williams, Goldberg and Black. CBS passed on the series in May 2014, and Sony Pictures Television began shopping it to other networks. It was announced in July 2014 that TV Land had ordered the series and, unlike previous networks, granted the Gaffigans full creative control. Jim Gaffigan said of the announcement: "I am thrilled that TV Land is giving us this opportunity to do this show that Peter, Jeannie and I have been fine-tuning for three years." TV Land president Larry W. Jones said the series was perfect for its target audience of Generation Xers who are raising families. Jones said: "We love Jim Gaffigan's brand of humor. The second we saw this show we knew we wanted it on TV Land."

Writing
The series is partially based on the real lives of Jim and Jeannie Gaffigan, who have five children and live in a two-bedroom apartment in New York City. The age differences between the children were shortened for the television show, and Jeannie said, "The TV kids are sort of a snapshot of an earlier time in our lives when they were all younger". Episodes are built around actual incidents they've experienced. Other regular topics of Jim Gaffigan's stand-up comedy are part of the series, particularly his love of food. Jeannie said the list of props for the show is "almost 90 percent food ... which I thought was pretty funny".

Although Jim will play a comedian, a conscious decision was made not to regularly intersperse the narrative with his stand-up comedy, like in such popular shows as Seinfeld and Louie. He said of this decision: "I want this to be more about what happens off the stage. ... 'Stand-up comedian' is an occupation and, like our pilot, we're evolving into a much more mature show." Jim Gaffigan and Peter Tolan wrote the pilot together.  The rest of the series is written by Jim and his wife Jeannie.

Crew
Jeff Lowell was the showrunner for Season 1 The Jim Gaffigan Show, and served as an executive producer along with Jim and Jeannie Gaffigan, Jim's real-life wife, a fictional version of whom will also appear in the show. Jeannie took over the showrunner position for Season 2. Alex Murray and Sandy Wernick will also be executive producers.

Filming
Production on the single-camera series began in 2015. Filming occurred at such New York City locations as Katz's Delicatessen and the Gotham Comedy Club.  The set is an exact replica of their former apartment, set on a soundstage.

Broadcast
Comedy Central, a cable network owned by TV Land parent company Viacom, aired episodes of the series one week after they debuted. New episodes were simulcast on Nick at Nite. Episodes are available on video on demand on cable outlets and for streaming on Hulu (with a paid subscription) three weeks after airing on TV Land.

In Canada, The Jim Gaffigan Show aired on The Comedy Network. The show debuted on the network on December 1, 2015.

Reception
Early critical reviews were largely positive, with mixed comparisons to the show Louie.  Grading the show with an "A", Diane Werts with Newsday called the show "This summer's must-see comedy smash," adding, "I can't remember laughing out loud so consistently at a situation comedy maybe, um, ever."  In an overall favorable review, The New York Times called the show "quite funny." TV critic Ken Tucker said the show "gets better with each episode."  Some critics found the show too sterile.  The Hollywood Reporter said "Gaffigan's good-naturedness is pleasant, if not particularly interesting."  Entertainment Weekly, giving the show a "B−", said it was mostly "stray one-liners and stilted semi-riffs. Imagine a less nourishing Louie or Curb Your Enthusiasm."  The Washington Post remarked that, while "Gaffigan has perfected his shtick...It works as a stage presence, but not so much as a TV character."

Ending
Despite an overall positive critical reception, Jim and Jeannie decided not to pursue a third season. In a statement released on Jim Gaffigan's Twitter, he announced that "the time commitment to make the quality of show we wanted was taking us away from our most important project, our five children."

Series overview

Episodes

Season 1 (2015)

Season 2 (2016)

References

External links 
 
 

2015 American television series debuts
2016 American television series endings
2010s American single-camera sitcoms
English-language television shows
Cultural depictions of American men
Cultural depictions of comedians
TV Land original programming
Television series about families
Television series about comedians
Television shows set in New York City
Television series by Sony Pictures Television